The Paraná Miní River ) is an anabranch, or "secondary branch", and tributary of the Paraná River. It is located in the provinces of Santa Fe and Chaco, Argentina. In Chaco Province the Paraná Miní receives several relatively small tributaries, including the Tapenagá River, Palometa River, and Salado River (one of many Paraná tributaries named Salado).

There are several branches of the Paraná River named Paraná Miní, notably one in Corrientes Province.

See also
List of rivers of Argentina

References

 Rand McNally, The New International Atlas, 1993.

Rivers of Argentina
Rivers of Santa Fe Province
Rivers of Chaco Province
Tributaries of the Paraná River